"Now or Never" is the official second single by Outasight and was released on Warner Bros. Records. The song was released on May 11, 2012, and features on Outasight's debut album Nights Like These (2012). The music video was released to YouTube on September 17, 2012. It was also the official theme song for WWE's 2012 Survivor Series.

Chart performance

References

2012 singles
Warner Records singles
2012 songs
Songs written by Kara DioGuardi
Songs written by Andrew Goldstein (musician)